The Indiana Territory's at-large congressional district encompassed the entire area of the Indiana Territory.

A delegate to the United States Congress was elected from this district.

The territory was created from portions of the Northwest Territory leading up to the State of Ohio achieving statehood.

List of delegates representing the district 
The territory sent one non-voting delegate to the United States House of Representatives.

The area of Indiana Territory was reduced in 1805 by the creation of Michigan Territory, and again in 1809 by the creation of Illinois Territory.

Indiana becomes a state of the Union
On December 11, 1816, Indiana was admitted into the Union as a state.

See also
 United States congressional delegations from Northwest Territory
 List of United States congressional districts

References 

 

Territory
Former congressional districts of the United States
At-large United States congressional districts
Constituencies established in 1805
1805 establishments in Indiana Territory
Constituencies disestablished in 1816
1816 disestablishments in Indiana Territory